The Girl from the Marsh Croft is a 1958 West German drama film directed by Gustav Ucicky and starring Maria Emo, Claus Holm and Eva Ingeborg Scholz. It was adapted from the 1908 novel The Girl from the Marsh Croft by Selma Lagerlöf. It was a remake of a 1935 film of the same name.

The film's sets were designed by the art director Mathias Matthies and Ellen Schmidt. It was shot at the Wandsbek Studios in Hamburg.

Cast
Maria Emo as Helga Nilsson
Claus Holm as Gudmund Erlandsson
Eva Ingeborg Scholz as Hildur Lindgren
Horst Frank as Jan Lindgren
Werner Hinz as Vater Erlandsson
Hilde Körber as Mutter Ingeborg
Hans Nielsen as Amtmann Lindgren
Wolfgang Lukschy as Per Eric Martinsson
Joseph Offenbach as Kalle
Berta Drews as Mutter Nilsson
Josef Dahmen as Vater Nilsson
Hans Zesch-Ballot as Richter
Inge Meysel as Frau Martinsson
Alice Treff as Frau Lindgren

References

External links

1958 films
Films directed by Gustav Ucicky
Films based on Swedish novels
Films based on works by Selma Lagerlöf
West German films
Remakes of German films
Films set in the 1880s
Films set in Sweden
German historical drama films
1950s historical drama films
Films shot at Wandsbek Studios
Real Film films
1958 drama films
1950s German films
1950s German-language films